Biķernieki Parish is an administrative unit of Augšdaugava Municipality in the Latgale region of Latvia.

Towns, villages and settlements of Biķernieki Parish 
 Biķernieki

References

 
Parishes of Latvia
Latgale